is a Japanese manga series written and illustrated by Haruki. It has been serialized in Hakusensha's seinen ecchi-oriented digital manga magazine Harem since November 2018.

Publication
It has been serialized in Hakusensha's seinen ecchi-oriented digital manga magazine Harem since November 29, 2018. Hakusensha has collected its chapters into individual tankōbon volumes. The first volume was released on July 29, 2019. As of April 27, 2022, five volumes have been released.

In May 2021, Seven Seas Entertainment announced that they had licensed the manga for English release in North America. The series is being released under its Ghost Ship mature imprint, with the first volume published on November 2, 2021.

Volume list

See also
Kisei Jūi Suzune, another manga series created by Haruki

References

External links
  
 
 

Action anime and manga
Hakusensha manga
Historical anime and manga
Japanese webcomics
Ninja in anime and manga
Seinen manga
Seven Seas Entertainment titles
Sex comedy anime and manga
Webcomics in print